The 2021 Oregon State Beavers baseball team represented Oregon State University in the 2021 NCAA Division I baseball season. The Beavers played their home games at Goss Stadium at Coleman Field and were  members of the Pac-12 Conference. The team was coached by Mitch Canham in his 2nd season at Oregon State. The previous season was indefinitely suspended 14 games into the season after the NCAA abruptly canceled all winter and spring season tournaments, including the College World Series, in response to the COVID-19 pandemic.

Season synopsis
The Beavers entered the season unranked and picked to finish 4th in the Pac-12 Conference coaches preseason baseball poll.

Jake Mulholland passed Kevin Gunderson for most saves in Oregon State history when he threw his 38th career save in a 2–1 win against California.

Roster

Schedule and results

Forth Worth Regional

Rankings

2021 MLB draft

References

Oregon State Beavers baseball seasons
Oregon State
2021 in sports in Oregon
Oregon State